Mikhail "Misha" Koudinov (born 23 June 1991) is a New Zealand male artistic gymnast, representing his nation in international competitions.

At the 2006 Commonwealth Games in Melbourne, Koudinov was New Zealand's youngest representative. He participated in every edition of the World Championships, since 2007 in Stuttgart, Germany. He was one of three New Zealand gymnasts who competed in the 2016 Summer Olympics in Rio; the other two were Courtney McGregor and Dylan Schmidt.

In 2017, Koudinov had a new high bar element named after him in the Men's Code of Points. It is described as a Gaylord with a 1/1 turn

References

External links 
 

1991 births
Living people
New Zealand male artistic gymnasts
Russian and Soviet emigrants to New Zealand
Sportspeople from Auckland
Gymnasts at the 2016 Summer Olympics
Olympic gymnasts of New Zealand
Gymnasts at the 2018 Commonwealth Games
Commonwealth Games competitors for New Zealand
Originators of elements in artistic gymnastics
Gymnasts at the 2020 Summer Olympics
20th-century New Zealand people
21st-century New Zealand people
Gymnasts at the 2022 Commonwealth Games